Devi Adi Parashakti is a mythological television series based on the Hindu texts of the Shiva Purana, the Devi-Bhagavata Purana, the Markandeya Purana, and pan-Indian folktales of the Goddess. The series was created by Siddharth Kumar Tewary, directed by Loknath Pandey and Manish Singh, and produced by Swastik Productions. Rati Pandey plays the role of Devi Adi Parashakti and her incarnations Goddess Sati, and Goddess Parvati. Tarun Khanna played the role of Devi's husband, Lord Shiva with Kanan Malhotra as Lord Vishnu, Devi's brother. The show also features Sonia Singh as Goddess Diti, the main antagonist.

The serial first aired on February 10, 2020. Due to the COVID-19 lockdown in India, the show was delayed. This show started airing once again on November 9, 2020, and ended on December 26, 2020 in Dangal TV.

Plot

Devi Sakthi adhyaya 
The story begins with Shiva's questions on The Self and how he discovers that it was the Supreme Goddess Adi Parashakti who created him, Vishnu, and Brahma. Shiva destroys Brahma's arrogance by beheading his fifth head in a feast arranged by Brahma's sons like Daksha and Narada to honour their father. She reveals herself from the cut off head and imparts true wisdom of who She is to the Tridevas. She then assumes three different forms: Saraswati - who weds Brahma, Lakshmi - who weds Vishnu, and Shakti - who becomes Shiva's beloved, and resides with them in their respective abodes. Then Daksha, the son of Brahma gets his two daughters Diti and Aditi married to Rishi Kashyapa. Aditi gives birth to Devas like Devraj Indra and Pancha bhoota devas i.e., Surya, Varuna, Vayu, Agni and Prithvi. While, Diti who is jealous of her sister, gives birth to Daityas or demons. Brahma dev creates Svarga for Devas and Patala for Asuras. Infuriated Diti, takes oath that she will capture Svarga. In the course of time, an Asura named Tarakasura, a son of Diti obtains a boon from Brahma that he would only be killed by the offspring of Shiva. Thinking of himself as immortal, he displaces the Devas, the immortal enemies of the Asuras, from the heaven.

Devi Sati adhyaya 
Then compelled by her daughter Diti to separate Shakti from Shiva and Kailasha, Daksha compels Devi Shakti to be born as his and his wife Prasuti's daughter in earth as Sati. After Sati discovers Shiva, who Daksha disapproves of and abhors, she falls in love with him. Then, Lord Vishnu and Indra disguise themselves as Sages and guide her towards Lord Shiva.

Devi Kalyanasundari adhyaya 
Daksha gives up Sati, and she moves to Kailasha where Shiva and Sati's marriage ceremony starts. But, Tarakasura and his asuras sent by Diti, polluted the marriage yagna fire. But, Lord Shiva and Sati's marriage takes place without any ceremony and this type of marriage is named as Gandharva marriage and Sati's bride avatar is named as Kalyanasundari.

Devi Kali adhyaya 
In an attempt to humiliate Shiva and Sati, Daksha performs a Yajna inviting the residents of all the realms, with the sole exceptions being the residents of Kailasha. Sati, however, goes to the Yajna, where she is humiliated. As a result, she immolates herself in the presence of all those gathered. Infuriated Shiva and Shakti beheaded Daksha, thus avenging Sati's death by assuming the terrible forms of Veerabhadra and Kali. Later on, Daksha's head is replaced with an goat's head. Sati's body is cut up into fifty-two pieces - which become Shakti Peethas, and sorrowful Shiva isolates himself in the caves of the Amarnath.

Devi Shailaputri adhyaya 
At the behest of Vishnu, then Devi takes birth once again as the daughter of the Himavat and Mainavati. She was named by Vishnu in his disguise as a doctor by the name Shailaputri who is the daughter (putri) of King of mountains (Shaila). Meanwhile, Diti sends her demon to get all the Shakti Peethas for consuming them to get supreme power. So, Vishnu in the disguise of doctor makes baby Parvati to tell the name "Shiva". This awoke Lord Shiva to take his Bhairava avatar. In his Bhairava avatar, Lord Shiva protected Shakti Peethas from the demons. Known by the birth of Devi, Tarakasura and Diti sent their demonic army to kill her. So, King Himavat and Queen Mainavati move to the ashram of Rishi Markandeya.

Devi Parvati adhyaya 
In the ashram, she was named as Devi Parvati. She grew there as his (Markandeya's) disciple. She was taught with Shiva's devotion by the Rishi. On the other hand, Diti sends demoness Bahurupa to kill the child. But Parvati wins her by giving moksha to the demoness. Parvati too, just like in her previous life as Sati, falls in love with Shiva. Later on the day of Mahashivaratri, she wished to marry Lord Shiva. Rishi also accepted and guided her in right way.

Devi Brahmacharini adhyaya 
She found him in the caves of her father's kingdom and sits at his feet, meditating upon him and gets the name Brahmacharini one who done a great penance. In a rush to awaken Shiva so that he would fall in love with Devi again and have a son who could kill Tarakasura, the Devas deploy Kama, the God of Love, who is burnt to ashes by Shiva for disturbing his trance. Hearing the death of her husband, Devi Rati curses Parvati that she could never bear a child.

Devi Sundareshwari adhyaya 
Shiva, although aware of Parvati's devotion and love towards him, behaves indifferently to her. When she tries to speak to him, he informs her that only after she passes some of his tests, would she obtain the desire of her heart. Parvati agrees to his challenge, and Shiva puts her through various trials, in Kashi and in Kailasha, all of which she passes. This impresses Shiva, who agrees to marry her. To celebrate Shiva's marriage, in Kailasha, a ceremony conducted where all Devas, Shiva gan are drunk with liquor. Now, Diti plots a plan to make Rishi Durvasa enter the ceremony. There Nandi greets Durvasa with liquor which makes him anger and made him to curse that he will also be blocked in the way. Also, Durvasa curses that Shiva's marriage would not take place in his normal form. Then, marriage rituals starts. First Nandi is asked to take the haldi [used for Lord Shiva] and give it to Parvati. Here, Tarakasura stops Nandi in his way and kills him. Stopped by Durvasa's curse, Shiva can't rescue Nandi. After his death, Lord Shiva got very anger. Understanding Lord Shiva's anger, Devi Parvati calls Shukracharya. He gives rebirth to Nandi. According to Durvasa's curse, Lord Shiva starts his marriage procession in Aghori form. Meanwhile, Devi Parvati decorates herself as bride with the name Sundareshwari.

Devi Chandraghanta adhyaya 
Meanwhile, Daksha's family is also invited to the marriage. Daksha's another daughter Revati is worried that, her husband Lord Chandra is cursed by Daksha that he is only close to his only one daughter while he is married to all his 27 daughters. To remove the curse of Lord Chandra and to perform the Equilibrium Jewelry ritual, Shiva keeps Chandra in his head and Devi Parvati takes the avatar of Chandraghanta. When Himavat and Mainavati sees Shiva as Aghori, they refuse for the marriage. Then according to the idea of Parvati, Shiva was dressed as Sundareshwarar with the help of Vishnu. Then the marriage of Shiva and Parvati occurs.

Devi Kushmanda adhyaya 
During a marriage ritual when Parvati is asked to wash Shiva's foot. Shiva informs that he had to wash her foot. Puzzled Parvati states that she was only a human. Then, Parvati learns about who she really is with the help of Shiva and takes the avatar of Kushmanda one who is the goddess of cosmos.

Devi Annapurna adhyaya 
Then Devi arranges a feast in Kailash where all Devas are invited. There Devas get satisfied with the food prepared by Devi and Devi assures that Tarakasura will be surely slayed by hers and Shiva's child. Then Devi takes the avatar of Annapurna. Meanwhile, Devi Ganga is forced to go into the earth, away from the Svarga to give moksha for ancestors. So, infuriated Ganga tries to destroy the earth by using her complete force. So, Lord Shiva takes her in his hair band and releases her calmly in the earth.

Devi Lalitha adhyaya 
Rishi Bhringi arrives to Kailasha to pray Lord Shiva. He offers prayer only to Shiva dishonoring Devi Parvati. He also informs that a lady is not enough to be prayed. Infuriated Parvati merges with Lord Shiva to take the avatar of Ardhanarishvara and stated that both male and female are equal. Meanwhile, Tarakasura threatens the devas by capturing Deva Lok. So Parvati and Shiva do a penance together, which results in the creation of power-ball. To slay Bhandasura who tries to destroy the power-ball, Devi Parvathi takes the form of Lalitha and slays him with the acceptance of Rati.

Devi Kartika adhyaya 
But by the act of Bhandasura, the power ball fell down into the river. At last it smashed in a stone and turned into six pieces that turned into six children which was caught by Kartikai ladies in Kartikai loka. To test Kartikai ladies' love towards the children, Parvati takes the disguise as Devi Kartika and tests them.

Devi Skandamata adhyaya 
In this test, Kartikai ladies got passed. Also, in Kartikai loka, no negative energies can't enter. So, Parvati thinks that Kartikai loka is safer that Kailash. Therefore, she left her children with them and reunited all the six children into Kartikeya (son of Karthikai ladies) or Skanda (one who born from stone smash) and she got the name of Skandamata.

Ashta Matrika adhyaya 
After this, they are threatened by the demon duos Shumbha and Nishumbha, another sons of Diti. Shumbha falls in love with Parvati. He orders Chanda and Munda to bring her to the netherworld. Angered by this, Parvati changes into Kali, her untamed warrior form with the help of the Ashta matrikas. Then as Kali, she slays Chanda-Munda. Frightened Shumbha asks the help from Diti, who sends Raktabija and Devi Kali kills him and drinks his blood. To calm Devi Kali, Lord Shiva falls in the path of her. Kali steps on him and realises her mistake. To get rid of her guilt, she sacrifices all her powers and isolates herself in a cave where she gets sorrow with the help of Rishi Markandeya and who indeed helps him for writing Markandeya Purana.

Devi Kaushiki adhyaya 
On the other hand, to bring Parvati to netherworld, Nishumbha comes to the cave. First Devi Parvati goes inside Karthika loka and slays the demon who tried to kill Kartikeya by changing into a peacock as only positive energies can enter there. Then, to kill Nishumbha, Parvati takes the form of Devi Kaushiki and slays him.

Devi Mahagauri adhyaya 
After Nishumbha's death, Devi Parvati returns to Kailasha. She got rid from the guilt of stamping her husband, she was consoled by her guru that once she was cursed that she can't bear a child for her husband's anger. Then in Kailash Devas gave her a great welcoming ceremony and gives her the name of Mahagauri.

Devi Kalratri adhyaya 
Parvati takes the form of Kalaratri to corner Shumbha and in her original divine form, she kills Shumbha. This is a huge shock to Diti. Then Kartikeya gets his adult age and to complete his purpose for birth, he goes to Kailash from Kartikai loka for learning the art of war from his real mother Parvati. Initially, he hated his mother.

Devi Katyayani adhyaya 
Parvati takes the form of Katyayani from the yagna in sage Katyayana's ashram and kills Mahishasur in order to save the inhabitants of Dev Lok and Kartikeya. Now, Kartikeya is happy with his mother. Devi Parvati teaches Kartikeya about the rules of war. Meanwhile, Tarakasura arranges a battle in Kailash. On the other hand, Kartikeya learns the art of war and battle from his mother Parvati, and succeeds in killing Tarakasura.

Devi Siddhidhartri adhyaya 
Diti realises her mistakes and finally surrenders to Devi. Everyone assembles in Kailash where the devas including Shiva, Vishnu and Brahma and the demons including Diti perform the ritual of Maha Aarti to Devi. The show ends with Devi attaining her form of Siddhidhatri and giving blessings to everyone.

Cast 
 Rati Pandey as Adi Parashakti and her avatars:
Dasa Mahavidya: Shakti, Sati, Kalyanasundari, Kali, Parvati, Sundareshwari, Lalitha, Annapurna, Kartika, Kaushiki
Nava Durga: Shailaputri, Brahmacharini, Chandraghanta, Kushmanda, Skandamata, Katyanani, Kalaratri, Mahagauri, Siddhidhatri
Ashta Matrika: Brahmani, Vaishnavi, Raudri, Ambika, Mahendri, Dandinatha, Chamunda, Pratyangira
Tarun Khanna as Mahadev and his avatars:
Veerabhadra
Aghori
Sundareshwarar
Bhairava
Ardhanarishvara
 Kanan Malhotra as Vishnu
 Sonia Singh as Diti
 Richa Dixit as Lakshmi
 Deepak Dutta as Brahma
 Nisha Nagpal/Sangeeta Odwani as Saraswati
Krish Chauhan as Kartikeya 
 Deepali Saini as Menavati
 Yogesh Mahajan as Himavan
 Raj Premi as Prajapati Daksha
 Heer Malik as Prasuti
 Raja Kapse as Markandeya 
 Vinit Kakar as Raktabija
 Shalini Vishnudev as Aditi
 Kunal Bakshi as Indra
 Ajay Mishra as Narada
 Himanshu Bamzai as Mahishasura
 Nimai Bali as Shukracharya
 Saif Ullah Rahmani as Tarkasura
 Rohhit Parshuram as Bandasura
 Kanishka Soni as Ganga
 Naman Rupa Mukuil as Nandi
 Poonam Rao as Revati
 Danika Singh as Bahurupa
 Aleya Ghosh as Prithvi
 Sandeep Arora as Kaamdev
 Harsha Khandeparkar as Rati
 Ujjwal Sharma as Varuna
 Sumit Tiwari as Vayu 
 Deepesh Gangawat as Agni 
 Sanjay Sharma as Surya 
 Govind Sharma/Raju Makwana as Shiv Gan

Production

Development

Series' title 
The show was originally planned to be called Devi but later it was changed to Devi Aadi Parashakti. It is still referred to in short as Devi.

Music and Background Score composed by Lenin Nandi & Shaam Chettri.

Casting 
The show casts actors who have already been famous for their mythological characters. Tarun Khanna who played Shiva in Swastik's RadhaKrishn and Karmaphal Daata Shani reprises his role in the show. Rohit Khurana who played Shani in Swastik's Mahakali — Anth Hi Aarambh Hai and Karmaphal Daata Shani reprises his role in the show. Kanan Malhotra who played the role of Vishnu in Swastik's Mahakali — Anth Hi Aarambh Hai also reprises his role. Kunal Bakshi who played the role of Indra in Swastik's Karmphal Daata Shani, also reprises his role. The makers have recast actors who have already been associated with Swastik Productions such as Rati Pandey, Nimai Bali and Saurabh Raj Jain (as narrator).

When the Young/child casts who played already been famous for different mythological. Krish Chauhan already starring in Mahakali — Anth Hi Aarambh Hai and Ram Siya Ki Luv Kush when this show is his third mythological show. 

Meanwhile, this serial's some casts was replaced. Aleya Ghosh replaced by Dharshna Sripal Golecha and Sanjay Sharma replaced by Salil Ankola.

Broadcast
This show aired on Dangal TV on 10 February 2020, but the telecast was stopped in the last week of March 2020 due to the COVID-19 pandemic. The show made a return on November 9, 2020.

Dubbed Version
This show is also arrived in South Indian languages. Sun TV (India) acquired Tamil language version; Gemini TV took Telugu language version; Udaya TV bought Kannada version; Surya TV acquired Malayalam version.

References

External links 

Official Dangal TV Website
 Swastik Productions

Indian television series about Hindu deities
2020 Indian television series debuts
Hindi-language television shows
Dangal TV original programming
Swastik Productions television series